Mohammad Ilkhani (born 1958) (Persian: محمد ایلخانی) is an Iranian philosopher and professor and chair of the department of philosophy at the Shahid Beheshti University. He is known for his research on Achard of St. Victor, Boethius and Christian theology.

Ilkhani received his PhD from Free University of Brussels under the supervision of Lambros Couloubaritsis.

Bibliography
 La Philosophie de la creation chez chard de Saint Victor, Paris: Brielle's, 1999
 De unitate et pluritale, Achard's Latin text, translation and commentary, University of Dallas
 Boethius's Metaphysics, Tehran: Ilham, 2002
 History of Medieval philosophy, Terhan: SAMT, 2004
 Islamic and Western Schools and Universities in Middle Ages, Tehran: IHCS

See also 
Iranian philosophy

Sources

External links
 Ilkhani's Articles
 Mohammad Ilkhani

Academic staff of Shahid Beheshti University
Université catholique de Louvain alumni
Université libre de Bruxelles alumni
1958 births
Living people
University of Tehran alumni
Writers from Tehran
Philosophy academics
20th-century Iranian philosophers
21st-century Iranian philosophers
Scholars of medieval philosophy